Ratzenberger is a surname. Notable people with the surname include:

Franz Ratzenberger (born 1965), Austrian sprinter
John Ratzenberger (born 1947), American actor, director, producer, writer, and entrepreneur
Roland Ratzenberger (1960–1994), Austrian racing driver

German-language surnames